Kim Joo-hyung (born 21 June 2002), commonly known as Tom Kim, is a South Korean professional golfer. He has won twice each on the PGA Tour, the Asian Tour, and the Korean Tour.

Early life and amateur career
Kim was born in Seoul, South Korea and is the son of a professional golfer, Kim Chang-ik, who played on the Buy.com Tour before becoming a teaching professional. As a result, Kim was based in Australia, the Philippines and later Thailand for a number of years. In 2018 he won the Philippine Amateur Open Championship and the W Express RVF Cup Amateur Championship.

Professional career
Kim turned professional in May 2018, playing on the Philippine Golf Tour. In 2019 he initially played mostly on the Asian Development Tour. In March he had two fourth-place finishes in Malaysia and then two runner-up finishes in Thailand before winning his first event, the PGM ADT Championship, in Malaysia in late June, six strokes ahead of the field. He won the Ciputra Golfpreneur Tournament in Indonesia in August, after a playoff, and the Raya Pakistan Open by nine shots in October. His third win gave him automatic promotion to the Asian Tour for the rest of 2019. In November, he won the Panasonic Open India, becoming, at 17 years and 149 days, the second youngest professional to win on the Asian Tour. The event was reduced to 54 holes because of smog.

In early 2020, he finished fourth in the SMBC Singapore Open. The event was part of the Open Qualifying Series and his high finish gave him an entry into the 2020 Open Championship, his first major championship.

Kim won the 2022 Singapore International, beating Rattanon Wannasrichan in a playoff. The following week he recorded a runner-up finish at the SMBC Singapore Open, seeing him finish as the leading money winner of the 2020–21–22 Asian Tour season. In July, Kim finished solo-third at the Genesis Scottish Open, a co-sanctioned event between the PGA Tour and the European Tour; he was one of three players who had earned entry to the tournament through the Korea Professional Golfers' Association (KPGA). With a T47 finish at the 2022 Open Championship, Kim became eligible for Special Temporary Membership on the PGA Tour for the remainder of the 2021–22 season. He earned his PGA Tour card for the 2022–23 season with a 7th place finish at the Rocket Mortgage Classic. The following week, he shot a final-round 61 to win the Wyndham Championship and gain entry into the 2022 FedEx Cup Playoffs. At the Wyndham Championship, he began the tournament with a quadruple-bogey 8 and finished it with a 9-under 61 for a five-shot victory.

Kim qualified for the International team at the 2022 Presidents Cup; he won two and lost three of the five matches he played, and was hailed by the media as one of the stars of the event due to his entertaining play.

In October 2022, Kim won the Shriners Children's Open in Las Vegas, Nevada; in doing so, he became the second youngest two-time PGA Tour winner behind Ralph Guldahl, and the first player to win twice on tour before the age of 21 since Tiger Woods in 1996.

Personal life
Kim also goes by Tom, a name derived from Thomas the Tank Engine.

Amateur wins
2017 Philippine Junior Amateur
2018 Philippine Amateur Open Championship, W Express RVF Cup Amateur Championship

Source:

Professional wins (11)

PGA Tour wins (2)

Asian Tour wins (2)

*Note: The 2019 Panasonic Open India was shortened to 54 holes due to weather.
1Co-sanctioned by the Professional Golf Tour of India

Asian Tour playoff record (1–0)

Korean Tour wins (2)

Asian Development Tour wins (3)

1Co-sanctioned by the Professional Golf of Malaysia Tour
2Co-sanctioned by the PGA Tour of Indonesia

Philippine Golf Tour wins (2)

Results in major championships
Results not in chronological order in 2020.

CUT = missed the half-way cut
"T" = tied
NT = No tournament due to COVID-19 pandemic

Results in The Players Championship

"T" indicates a tie for a place

Team appearances
Professional
Presidents Cup (representing the International team): 2022

References

External links

South Korean male golfers
Asian Tour golfers
PGA Tour golfers
2002 births
Living people